Bernardo José Espinosa Zúñiga (born 11 July 1989) is a Colombian professional footballer who plays as a central defender for Spanish club Girona.

Club career

Sevilla
Born in Cali, Espinosa finished his youth career in Spain with Sevilla FC. After appearing in one match for the reserves in 2007–08 (five minutes) he proceeded to spend a further three full seasons with them, one in the Segunda División and two in the Segunda División B, only starting regularly in his last.

Espinosa made his first-team – and La Liga – debut on 11 May 2011, playing 90 minutes in a 3–2 away loss against CA Osasuna. In the ensuing summer, he was loaned to Racing de Santander in a season-long move.

Espinosa scored his first top-flight goal for the Cantabrians on 7 January 2012, heading home the game's only in a home win against Real Zaragoza.

Sporting Gijón
On 26 December 2012, after not featuring at all for Sevilla in the first half of the campaign, Espinosa was loaned to Sporting de Gijón in the second division. The following 26 June he signed a permanent three-year contract, scoring three goals while only missing one game in 42 in the 2014–15 campaign to help the Asturians to return to the top tier after three years.

Espinosa missed the second part of 2015–16, due to a serious knee injury.

Middlesbrough
On 15 June 2016, at the expiration of his contract, Espinosa joined newly promoted Premier League side Middlesbrough on a three-year deal. Still recovering from his anterior cruciate ligament ailment when he arrived, he gained regular playing time during the second half of the season, being third choice in his position behind Calum Chambers and Ben Gibson.

Girona
On 7 July 2017, after being relegated, Espinosa signed with Girona FC for an undisclosed fee. He was an undisputed starter during his two seasons at the club, suffering relegation at the end of his second.

Espinosa was loaned to RCD Espanyol of the top division on 6 July 2019, with a buyout clause. He scored his first competitive goal on 27 October, the only in an away victory over Levante UD.

International career
In November 2015, Espinosa was named in Colombia's squad for a 2018 FIFA World Cup qualifier against Argentina, but eventually did not make his debut. He was called up again in March 2018, for friendlies with France and Australia.

Espinosa was named in a preliminary 35-man squad for the finals in Russia, but he did not make the final cut.

Career statistics

Honours
Individual
Segunda División Best Defender: 2014–15

References

External links

1989 births
Living people
Colombian footballers
Footballers from Cali
Association football defenders
La Liga players
Segunda División players
Segunda División B players
Sevilla Atlético players
Sevilla FC players
Racing de Santander players
Sporting de Gijón players
Girona FC players
RCD Espanyol footballers
Premier League players
Middlesbrough F.C. players
Colombian expatriate footballers
Expatriate footballers in Spain
Expatriate footballers in England
Colombian expatriate sportspeople in Spain
Colombian expatriate sportspeople in England